Colonel Joseph Franklin Siler, MD (1875–1960) was a U.S. Army physician noted for investigations of mosquito transmission of dengue fever in the Philippines and for Marijuana Smoking in Panama, one of the first experimental reports on cannabis.

Siler was commander the Laboratory Service in the American Expeditionary Forces in France in World War I and undertook extensive experimental observations on the manufacture and immunizing efficacy of anti-typhoid vaccines.

See also 
 Army Medical School

References

External links

Bayne-Jones, Stanhope (1968), The Evolution of Preventive Medicine in the United States Army, 1607-1939,  Office of the Surgeon General, Department of the Army, Washington, D.C. (Photo of Siler)

1875 births
1960 deaths
Cannabis researchers
United States Army Medical Corps officers